Astangu (Estonian for "Terrace") is a subdistrict in the district of Haabersti, Tallinn, the capital of Estonia. It has a population of 3,274.

Gallery

References

Subdistricts of Tallinn